Ike Omar Sanda Nwachukwu  mni (born 1 September 1940) is a retired Army officer and Nigerian politician who served twice as Foreign Minister of Nigeria and as a Senator in the National Assembly delegation from Abia State.

Education and training
Born on September 1, 1941 in Port Harcourt to an Igbo father and a Fulani mother of Katsina, Nwachukwu had his early education at the Ladi-Lak Institute, Yaba, Lagos, and Lagos City College, also in Yaba, Lagos. He obtained his initial military training at the Nigerian Military Training College, Kaduna, course 6, then proceeded to the Royal Canadian School of Infantry, and then furthered his training at the School of Infantry, Warminster, United Kingdom. He also studied at the Institute of Humanitarian Law, San Remo, Italy, the United Nations Peace Academy, and the National Institute for Policy and Strategic Studies (NIPPS), Kuru, Plateau State.
Ike Nwachukwu rose to the rank of major general prior to his retirement with the Nigerian Army.

Career
Nwachukwu held the position of Military Governor of Imo State, where he moved Imo State University (now Abia State University) in Uturu to its permanent site. From 1986 to 1987 he was Minister for Employment, Labour and Productivity, where he founded the National Directorate of Employment (NDE) to alleviate the problems of unemployment, especially graduate unemployment.

Nwachukwu was Minister of Foreign Affairs from December 1987 to December 1989, when he was replaced by Rilwanu Lukman, returning to a field military command position. In September 1990 he was re-appointed Minister of Foreign Affairs, being replaced in January 1993 by Matthew Mbu during the transition to civilian rule. He was active and effective as Foreign Minister, taking a mercantilist approach to diplomacy.

Chairmanships
Among the organizations and groups Nwachukwu has served as the chairman of are the Organization of African Unity Liberty Committee, the Organization of African Unity Council of Ministers (three terms), the Economic Community of West African States Council of Ministers, plenary sessions of the Non-Aligned Movement, and the Governing Council of the African Regional Labour Administration Center.

Delegations led
Nwachukwu has headed and led several delegations to various international summits and negotiations, and obtained resolutions from the United Nations on behalf of Nigeria. Some of them include: addressing the United Nations General Assembly and chairing United Nations special sessions on varying subjects, leading the Organization of African Unity Ministerial Delegation to the Conference for Democratisation of South Africa, leading Nigeria’s negotiations for Agenda 21 and the convention at the Earth Summit in Rio de Janeiro, Brazil.

Senate
As an Abia State senator, Nwachukwu served as Chairman of two senate committees, the Senate Committee on Power and Steel and the Senate Committee on Governmental Affairs.

Honors and awards
Nwachukwu was conferred with several medals and decorations whilst in military service, as well as traditional titles in his present status as a civilian.

Decorations and service medals
Nwachukwu's national decorations and service medals include: the Nigerian Independence Medal, the Forces Service Star, the Defence Service Star, the Nigeria Republic Medal, the National Service Medal, and the order of commander, Federal Republic of Nigeria (CFR).

National merit awards
Nwachukwu has been awarded three national merit awards. They are the Special Certificate of Merit of the African Youth Congress, the Award of Recognition of the Iron and Steel Senior Staff Association of Nigeria (ISSSAN), and the Merit Award by Achike Udenwa, former Governor of Imo State, on the occasion of the state's Silver Jubilee.

International awards
Nwachukwu has been conferred with several international medals and awards, which include the Grand Commander of Equatorial Guinea, presented by the President of Equatorial Guinea, the Federal Republic of Germany's Grand Cross of Merit (GMCS), the Grand Master of the National Order of the Southern Cross (GMSC), from the President of Brazil, the Diplomatic Medal (DMM) from the President of the South Korea, the Grand Cruz de la Order dei Merito Civil de Espana (GCMC), by King Juan Carlos I of Spain, the Knight Grand Cross of the Order of St Michael and St George (GCMG), awarded by Queen Elizabeth II of the United Kingdom, and the Commander of the Order of Mono (COM) from Gnassingbé Eyadéma, President of Togo.

References

1940 births
Living people
Igbo politicians
Governors of Imo State
Politicians from Port Harcourt
People from Abia State
Commanders Crosses of the Order of Merit of the Federal Republic of Germany
Members of the Senate (Nigeria)
Foreign ministers of Nigeria
Members of the Nigerian National Institute of Policy and Strategic Studies
Nigerian Fula people
Candidates in the Nigerian general election, 2003
20th-century Nigerian politicians